Inside of You is the second studio album by American R&B artist Aaron Hall, it was released on October 20, 1998 on MCA Records. The album's first single "All the Places (I Will Kiss You)" became a top 10 hit on Billboard's Top Hip Hop/R&B Songs and hit the top 30 on Billboards Hot 100 chart.

Track listingNotes'
 Track #11 contains replayed elements from the song "Don't Look of Love" written by Burt Bacharach and Hal David.

Credits
Executive-Producer – Aaron Hall, Bennie Diggs
Mastered By – Chris Gehringer
Mixed By – Dave Way (tracks: 1 to 3, 5 to 9, 12 to 14)
Producer – Aaron Hall III* (tracks: 1 to 3, 5 to 14)
Recorded By – John Wydrycs (tracks: 1, 3, 6, 8, 11, 13, 14), Kenneth Lewis* (tracks: 2, 5 to 11), Scott Kieklak (tracks: 2, 5, 6 to 12)

Charts

Singles

References

External links
Inside of You, Aaron Hall at amazon
Albums by Aaron Hall at FM Music

1998 albums
Aaron Hall (singer) albums
MCA Records albums